Quicksilver (Pietro Maximoff) is a  fictional character appearing in American comic books published by Marvel Comics. The character first appeared in the comic book The Uncanny X-Men #4 (March 1964) and was created by Stan Lee and Jack Kirby. The character has since starred in two self-titled limited series and has historically been depicted as a regular team member in superhero title The Avengers.

Quicksilver has the superhuman ability to move at great speeds. In most depictions, he is a mutant, a human born with innate superhuman powers. In comic book stories beginning in 2015, he is the product of genetic experimentation by the High Evolutionary. Quicksilver most commonly appears in fiction associated with the X-Men, having been introduced as an adversary for the superhero team. In later stories, he became a superhero himself. He is the twin brother of the Scarlet Witch and, in most depictions, the son of Magneto and the half-brother of Polaris.

Debuting in the Silver Age of comic books, Quicksilver has featured in several decades of Marvel continuity, starring in the self-titled series Quicksilver and as a regular team member in superhero title the Avengers.

The character has also appeared in a range of movie, television, and video game adaptations. Two separate live-action versions of Quicksilver have been adapted by two different film studios: Aaron Taylor-Johnson portrayed the character in the Marvel Cinematic Universe (MCU) franchise, appearing in Captain America: The Winter Soldier (2014) as a cameo and Avengers: Age of Ultron (2015) while Evan Peters portrayed him in the 20th Century Fox films X-Men: Days of Future Past (2014), X-Men: Apocalypse (2016) and Dark Phoenix (2019), as well as a cameo in Deadpool 2 (2018). Peters later appeared as an imposter Pietro in the MCU television series WandaVision (2021), as a nod to his past role.

Publication history

Quicksilver first appears in X-Men #4 (March 1964) and was created by writer Stan Lee and artist/co-writer Jack Kirby. The character initially appears as an antagonist to the X-Men, although before long he becomes a member of the Avengers and appears as a regular character in that title beginning with The Avengers #16 in May 1965. He has made numerous other appearances in that title, and other related titles, sometimes as a member of the team, sometimes as an ally, and sometimes as an antagonist.

From 1991 to 1993 Quicksilver was a regular character in the first volume of X-Factor. The series emphasized the character's irritability and arrogance, which writer Peter David felt were a natural consequence of his powers, explaining: 

Quicksilver also starred in Quicksilver, a regular ongoing eponymous series that began in November 1997 and ran for 13 issues.

The character also played a pivotal role in the House of M and Avengers: The Children's Crusade.

Quicksilver appeared as a supporting character in Avengers Academy from issue #1 (August 2010) through its final issue #39 (January 2013). He appears as one of the members of All-New X-Factor, which was launched in 2014 as part of the second Marvel NOW! wave. Writer Peter David's handling of the character in that book earned the character a 2014 @ssie award from Ain't It Cool News. 
AICN's Matt Adler commented that David writes the character best and that the "arrogant, impatient speedster" made the title worth following.

Fictional character biography
Pietro and his twin sister, Wanda, were raised by Django and Marya Maximoff, a Romani couple. As adolescents, Pietro Django Maximoff and his sister Wanda discovered that they had peculiar talents. When Django began to steal food to feed his starving family, enraged villagers attacked the Roma camp. Using his phenomenal speed, Pietro fled from the camp with his sister. Over the next few years, Wanda and Pietro wandered Central Europe, living off the land.

The character first appears with Wanda, now called the Scarlet Witch, as a part of the Brotherhood of Evil Mutants. The siblings were originally presented as mutants, with Pietro possessing superhuman speed and Wanda able to control probability. The pair are recruited by Magneto after he saves Wanda from a mob after she accidentally causes a house to burst into flame. Quicksilver stays with her to protect her. After several confrontations with the X-Men, they depart when Magneto and his lackey the Toad are abducted by the cosmic entity the Stranger. They then travel back to Europe. Pietro and his sister reform and are recruited by Iron Man to the superhero team the Avengers, after they discover they are advertising for new members and want to get support for themselves.

Together with the leader Captain America and former villain Hawkeye, the four become the second generation of Avengers, and are later dubbed "Cap's Kooky Quartet". Quicksilver first thinks he should be the leader and would sometimes quarrel with the other members. The Scarlet Witch becomes close friends with Hawkeye and both become loyal members of the team until Wanda is accidentally shot on a mission against Magneto. Quicksilver then flees from the Avengers with his wounded sister. The pair accompany Magneto back to his mid-Atlantic base, where he captures the X-Men and Pietro skirmishes with the X-Man Cyclops. The twins finally realize that Magneto is the true villain. Pietro and Wanda reappear in the title X-Men and are then kidnapped along with several other mutants by the robot Sentinels, and are subsequently freed by the X-Men.

The character reappears in the title The Avengers, and advises the team that Wanda has been kidnapped and taken to another dimension by the warlord Arkon. After Wanda is rescued, Pietro and his sister rejoin the team. During one mission Quicksilver is wounded by a Sentinel and is found by Crystal, a member of the Inhumans. Crystal nurses Pietro back to health, and the pair are eventually married. Pietro and Wanda also meet Robert Frank—formerly World War II hero, the Whizzer—who was present at Mount Wundagore (the birthplace of the siblings) with his wife at the time of their birth. Frank briefly joins the Avengers, believing Pietro and Wanda to be his children. The Scarlet Witch also becomes romantically involved with her Avengers teammate, the Android Vision. Although Pietro initially disapproves, he eventually gives his blessing to their marriage.

Quicksilver features with the Inhumans and Fantastic Four against the villain Sphinx, and the siblings' origin is explored in the title Avengers when a Romani man by the name Django Maximoff, (who is soon revealed to be their biological father), kidnaps Pietro and Wanda and returns to Mount Wundagore in the country of Transia, where they were born. After a battle with the Avengers against the Elder God Chthon, the siblings learn from Bova, one of the New Men created by the High Evolutionary, that they are the children of Maximoff, and not Robert Frank. Quicksilver then returns to Attilan (city of the Inhumans) and is revealed to have had a daughter (Luna) with Crystal.

During the limited series Vision and the Scarlet Witch, Magneto forces Bova to reveal the truth about his missing children, who are revealed to be Pietro and Wanda. After their mother Magda dies in childbirth, the children are given by the High Evolutionary to Django Maximoff to raise as his own. Pietro and Wanda reject Magneto when told. His marriage to Crystal is also strained when she has an affair. Maximus the Mad uses technology to cause Quicksilver to become psychotic. This drove him to frame the Avengers for treason as his perceptions are twisted to perceive them as having 'betrayed' him, forcing them to escape the government-sponsored Freedom Force, and then deal with Quicksilver's new 'team' of LMD-based duplicates of the Zodiac, until the Vision convinces Pietro to stand down by showing him images of his newborn nephews.

Quicksilver battles the West Coast Avengers and is captured by the Inhumans and cured of his condition. In an effort to repent for his actions, Pietro aids the Avengers West Coast against Magneto and the villain Immortus, who has captured Wanda. Although successful, Pietro refuses to return to Crystal and joins the U.S. government-sponsored superhero team X-Factor. The character and Crystal are reunited during the storyline "Bloodties" when the Avengers, X-Factor and X-Men team to stop a group of mutant terrorists who kidnap their daughter Luna, and are responsible for a civil war on the island nation of Genosha. After dealing with the threat, Quicksilver learns of Crystal's relationship with Avenger the Black Knight and leaves, also resigning from X-Factor.

Quicksilver takes his daughter Luna and travels to Mt. Wundergore, aiding the High Evolutionary and his Knights of Wundagore against Exodus and the Man Beast. Quicksilver uses the experimental Isotope E to augment his powers, allowing him to move at greater supersonic speeds. A future version of Pietro called "Nestor" appears and reveals that his powers are not speed but rather temporal based. Quicksilver also rejoins a reformed Avengers.

With half-sister Polaris, Quicksilver spies on their father Magneto, who is now the ruler of Genosha. Quicksilver is banished when he rallies the Avengers against Magneto.

House of M
Quicksilver plays a pivotal role in the limited series House of M, convincing his now mentally unstable sister Wanda to use her abilities to warp reality and create a world where mutants are in a majority and humans are the minority. Thanks to Wolverine retaining his memories, along with the mysterious Layla Miller, many of Earth's heroes regain their memories and battle Magneto, who also remembers and realizes that Pietro is to blame for this mistake. Magneto kills Quicksilver (crushing his body with a robot Sentinel) in a rage at this perceived 'abuse' of his dream, although the character is resurrected and the normal reality restored when the Scarlet Witch witnesses this, telling Magneto he cares more for mutants than his own children. In retaliation the Scarlet Witch has also depowered 98% of the mutant population, which by accident includes Quicksilver.

Son of M
The story continues in the limited series Son of M, with Quicksilver, desperate to regain his powers, exposing himself to the Terrigen Mist (the source of the Inhumans' mutations and abilities) and inserts Terrigen crystals into his body—all without permission from Black Bolt. Courtesy of the Terrigen crystals, Quicksilver gains new "time jumping" powers and kidnaps his daughter Luna. Quicksilver discovers the crystals can restore mutant abilities but have an extreme effect on non-Inhuman physiology, causing several deaths. Quicksilver and Crystal meet again in the direct sequel, limited series Silent War when Black Bolt demands the return of the crystals. When Crystal sees how he has mutated, she declares their marriage annulled according to Inhuman law.

In the title X-Factor, the crystals are removed from Quicksilver's body by Rictor, leaving him powerless once again. Destitute and jailed for vagrancy in the one-shot X-Factor: The Quick and the Dead, Quicksilver has a series of hallucinations and inexplicably regains his super speed. Escaping jail, Quicksilver rescues an innocent and rediscovers his desire to be a hero.

Mighty Avengers
Quicksilver appears in the title The Mighty Avengers and is used as a pawn by Elder God Chthon, with the character's spirit trapped in the arcane tome called the Darkhold. The Avengers defeat Chthon, and Quicksilver's consciousness is "downloaded" into the body of Vision, before being restored to his own body. Quicksilver joins the team after learning that it is Wanda (Asgardian god Loki in disguise) who brought the team together. After the events of the Secret Invasion storyline the character is publicly exonerated of former crimes, with an unknown Skrull being blamed (although Hank Pym, Maximoff's daughter Luna, and Avengers butler Edwin Jarvis are aware of the lie). Quicksilver also resumes wearing his original green costume. Quicksilver loses the respect of his daughter Luna when he lies to the Inhumans and claims that many of his past actions were actually perpetrated by a Skrull impostor, although Pym tolerates the lie as he feels that Quicksilver deserves a chance to redeem himself.

Quicksilver finally learns that the person he thought was his sister is actually Loki in disguise. Enraged, he and the rest of the team travel to the Isle of Silence to set a trap for the god of mischief. After imprisoning Loki in a device designed by Hank Pym, he begins torturing the god for information about Wanda's whereabouts. Loki offers no information about her and manages to contact Thor to beg for his help. Thor arrives and attacks Quicksilver for the way he is treating Loki. He is able to outrun the thunder god's lightning but is eventually overpowered. He is one of the Avengers who joins Hercules, Amadeus Cho and their allies in an assault on Olympus Group Headquarters. He battles Amazon warrior women alongside Zeus and helps a wounded Wolverine defeat the Huntsman, stabbing him through the chest with his own weapon.

Quicksilver is later summoned by the Ghost using Amadeus Cho's technology, to defend Asgard against the Thunderbolts. He single-handedly defeats Mister X who is in possession of the Spear of Odin. Mr. X is not able to react quickly enough despite his abilities and Quicksilver viciously beats him down with a piece of debris. He is seen alongside the other Avengers against the Void-possessed Sentry in the events of Siege.

Avengers: The Children's Crusade
Quicksilver is searching for his sister in Wundagore when Magneto and the Young Avengers go to find the Scarlet Witch. After trying to abduct his nephew Wiccan so he can assist him in finding his sister, he is stopped by his father and his other nephew, Speed. After Wiccan suggests that maybe Magneto actually did want to make up for his past, he became angry and said, "Nephew the last time I allowed myself to believe that..... My father tried to kill me". Quicksilver prepares to fight his father but when debris from his rampage strikes his sister it is found that the Scarlet Witch there is actually a Doombot in disguise. The journey takes Quicksilver and his comrades all the way to Latveria so they rescue the Scarlet Witch. After the Scarlet Witch turns herself into the X-Men and the Avengers a fight breaks out between the two groups. After being knocked out along with all the other Avengers and X-Men by his sister, he is finally reunited with his sister.

Heroic Age
Quicksilver joins the teaching staff of Avengers Academy to teach young students how to become heroes. He does so in order to distance himself from the legacy of his father Magneto. One of the new students, Finesse, figures out that his story about being abducted by Skrulls is a lie. She blackmails him into giving her "private lessons" on everything he learned during his time with the Brotherhood of Evil Mutants. Finesse convinces Quicksilver to help her search for the Taskmaster, who might be her biological father. After arriving at what they thought was an abandoned training camp, they found it still in use and quickly captured the criminals they found there. Quicksilver returned to the mansion and encountered Tigra, who was upset because some of the students assaulted the Hood on her behalf. During a heated exchange Quicksilver managed to convince her that kicking them out of Avengers Academy for trying to help would only turn them against becoming heroes. At the new campus for the Avengers Academy (where the Faculty are offering to train other superpowered youths), Quicksilver is revealed to be mentoring Lightspeed as a teacher's assistant.

In the miniseries "Magneto: Not a Hero", Joseph is resurrected under unknown circumstances and forms a new Brotherhood of Mutants with Astra and mutated deformed versions of Blob, Mastermind, Quicksilver, Scarlet Witch, and Toad. It is soon revealed that the mutated versions of Blob, Mastermind, Quicksilver, Scarlet Witch and Toad are clones created by Joseph.

Quicksilver has joined the privately owned superhero team X-Factor. When confronted during a press conference by Fatale over his actions meant to repower mutants and his lying about a Skrull having been responsible, Pietro finally admitted in public that he had been responsible and had tried to avoid facing the consequences; by doing this, he earned his daughter's respect back, and the two reconciled.

Wanda and other heroes and villains experienced a moral inversion during a clash with the Red Onslaught. Quicksilver and Magneto try to talk the inverted Wanda down, but when Wanda attacks them with a curse designed to punish her blood relatives that only affects Quicksilver, Wanda realizes that Magneto is not their biological father.

Quicksilver and Scarlet Witch later take a trip to Counter-Earth. After being tracked down and defeated by Luminous (a female who was created by the genetic material of Scarlet Witch and Quicksilver), Pietro and Wanda were brought to the High Evolutionary himself. He revealed to them that they are actually the long thought deceased children of Django and Marya Maximoff, Anna and Mateo. He also told them the truth where they were not mutants at all, but they had been experimented on by the High Evolutionary. After escaping from the High Evolutionary's experimentations, Pietro and Wanda located the Avengers Unity Division (who had traveled to the Counter-Earth looking for the twins) and helped the inhabitants of Lowtown (a refuge for the High Evolutionary's rejects) from their creator's assault. After the High Evolutionary is defeated and he escapes into a portal with Luminous, Quicksilver and Scarlet Witch return to Earth with the Avengers Unity Division.

All-New, All-Different Marvel
When the second superhero Civil War began, Pietro came to ask Wanda for help, but Wanda refused, because she and Pietro disagreed on which side was right - Pietro not liking the idea of profiling people based on what they might do and Wanda feeling that thinking about the future would have prevented many of their more dangerous mistakes in the past - past precedent made Wanda feel that introducing her powers to a conflict of this nature could be more dangerous than the existing situation, and she resented Pietro still trying to tell her what to do as though she was a child, bluntly informing him that his refusal to learn from his mistakes marked him as a sociopath. Wanda reveals to him that she is seeking answers about their true biological mother, Natalya Maximoff (who gave the twins to her relatives Marya and Django to spare them from a difficult life) and asks him to join her. He refuses and the two fight, although Wanda bests Quicksilver and tells him she never wants to see him again. Natalya's spirit later summons Pietro during their final battle against a physical manifestation of Chaos. The twins reconcile after destroying the monster and Pietro is briefly able to meet his mother before she sacrifices herself to save witchcraft. He has also been revealed to have fallen under the telepathic control of the Red Skull, acting as a 'sleeper agent' in the Avengers as part of the Skull's current campaign.

During the "Secret Empire" storyline, Quicksilver appears as a member of the Underground which is a resistance movement against Hydra, following their take over of the United States. Quicksilver and Hercules lead a strike force to find the Cosmic Cube fragments so that they can use it to restore Captain America and the country to normal.

Marvel Legacy
During the "Avengers: No Surrender" storyline, Quicksilver is one of the heroes remaining in the cosmic game between Grandmaster and Challenger. He is frozen because of Scarlet Witch’s attempt at reviving the frozen Vision, but the process was later reversed. He later uses his extreme agility and Scarlet Witch's powers to catch the beacon trapping his fellow Avengers, but in doing so he had pushed himself to the limit and apparently died. But in the following mini-storyline of Quicksilver: No Surrender, it is revealed that he became stuck in an alternate dimension, ultimately getting himself free and returning to the Avengers.

During the "Empyre" storyline, Quicksilver, Mockingbird, and Wonder Man deal with the Kree and the Skrull's fight with the Cotati near Navojoa. When Quicksilver is hit by special spheres fired by the Cotati magicians, Mockingbird and Wonder Man come to his aid and help the Kree and the Skrull turn the tide against the Cotati. Quicksilver recovers his stamina and uses his super-speed to break up the fight and dispose of the Kree and Skrull weapons in the Gulf of California.

Powers and abilities
Quicksilver was originally presented as a mutant capable of moving and thinking at superhuman speeds. Originally capable of running at the speed of sound, exposure to the High Evolutionary's Isotope E made it possible for the character to run at supersonic speeds of up to Mach 10 and resist the effects of friction, reduced oxygen, and kinetic impact while moving at super-speeds. Also, he has a fast metabolism and can heal more rapidly than the average human. His speed allows him to perform such feats as creating cyclone-strength winds and running up walls or across bodies of water. Pietro's mind can perceive information with a photographic memory short term, becoming faster than the speed of thought, because he can shift his thoughts at a speed faster than normal thought. Also, he can cause vibrations in his body to transfer to solid material and has superior agility and reflexes compared to other mutants. It has been revealed that one of the reasons for his abrasive and impatient personality is that it seems to him that the rest of the world is moving in slow motion and that he is constantly waiting for it to catch up. As he once explained, "Have you ever stood in line at a banking machine behind a person who didn't know how to use it?... Now, imagine, Doctor, that everyone you work with, everywhere you go, your entire world is filled with people who can't work cash machines".

Quicksilver lost his powers of speed when his sister removed most of his powers, but he gains new powers courtesy of the inhumans' Terrigen Mist. The mist gives Quicksilver the ability to displace himself out of mainstream time and space and "jump" into the future. He can summon several time-displaced duplicates of himself and appear to teleport by "jumping" into the future and then returning to the present at a new location. By voluntarily embedding fragments of the Terrigen Crystals into his own body, he could empower former mutants with extreme versions of their superhuman abilities. However, the effect was usually fatal. The crystals were subsequently forced from his body by the mutant Rictor, leaving him without these abilities. After having a series of hallucinations, Quicksilver saw a woman in mortal danger and felt a desire to be a hero which made him regain his original powers in order to save the woman's life. Later on, Quicksilver regained these enhanced powers of time "jumping" and temporal duplication for a while by physically imbedding the crystals into his flesh.

It was later revealed that Quicksilver actually was a normal child that was put through several experiments by the High Evolutionary which granted his powers in the first place.

Reception

Accolades 

 In 2006, IGN ranked Quicksilver 23rd in their  "Top 25 X-Men Of All Time" list. 
 In 2012, IGN ranked Quicksilver 44th in their "Top 50 Avengers" list.
 In 2016, Screen Rant ranked Quicksilver 6th in their "12 Fastest Superheroes Of All Time" list.
 In 2018, CBR.com ranked Quicksilver 10th in their "25 Fastest Characters In The Marvel Universe" list.
 In 2020, CBR.com ranked Quicksilver 5th in their "10 Greatest Speedsters In Comics" list.
 In 2021, Screen Rant ranked Quicksilver 3rd in their "10 Fastest X-Men In Marvel Comics" list.
 In 2021, Looper ranked Quicksilver 7th in their "Fastest Speedsters In History" list.
 In 2022, The A.V. Club ranked Quicksilver 71st in their "100 best Marvel characters" list.
 In 2022, Collider included Quicksilver in their "Top 5 Fastest Superheroes" list.
 In 2022, CBR.com ranked Quicksilver 8th and Ultimate Quicksilver 6th in their "20 Fastest Speedsters" list and 7th in their "10 Scariest Avengers" list.

Literary reception

Volumes

Avengers Origins: Scarlet Witch and Quicksilver - 2011 
According to Diamond Comic Distributors, Avengers Origins: Scarlet Witch and Quicksilver #1 was the 148th best selling comic book in November 2011.

Peyton Hinckle of ComicsVerse said, "Origin stories make superheroes. They tell us about a character’s motivations, dreams, and memories. They’re the perfect insight into why a character becomes a hero (or a villain). As readers, we need origin stories to understand the heroes we love. For a long time, Scarlet Witch and her brother Quicksilver had a half-formulated backstory. At first, they were just members of Magneto’s brotherhood. But, eventually, they realized that they were also Magneto’s children. The older comics don’t give us an up-close look at Wanda’s childhood, so in 2011 writer Sean McKeever tackled retelling Wanda and Pietro’s story in a modern climate. The result was Avengers Origins: Scarlet Witch and Quicksilver, which finally gave readers the origin story they wanted. If you want to read about Scarlet Witch, but have no idea where to start, this is the issue for you." George Marston of Newsarama ranked Avengers Origins: Scarlet Witch and Quicksilver 6th in their "The best Wanda Maximoff / Scarlet Witch stories of all time" list, asserting, "In comic books, Wanda and Pietro's time as villains was short-lived, and their prior history wasn't largely explored until years later, through glimpses and scattered stories. But 2011's Avengers Origins: Scarlet Witch & Quicksilver takes a deeper dive into the histories of the titular heroes, showing their past and the lead-up to their time with the Brotherhood of Evil Mutants in a way that wasn't previously told on the page. Wanda and Pietro's history is one of the most unlikely backbones of the Marvel Universe, with their simple origins growing from a throughline between the X-Men and Avengers to the saga of a family tree that has branches throughout Marvel Comics, and Avengers Origins: Scarlet Witch & Quicksilver presents a concise and engaging take on their earliest days."

Quicksilver: No Surrender - 2018 
According to Diamond Comic Distributors, Quicksilver: No Surrender #1 was the 119th best selling comic book in May 2018.

Joe Grunenwald of ComicsBeat asserted, "Quicksilver: No Surrender #1 is an entertaining first issue about a complicated protagonist. This series spins out of the events of Avengers: No Surrender, but is still perfectly accessible for new readers (like me), and only briefly mentions previous events before getting into its own story. It’s a solid beginning for the series." Joshua Davison of Bleeding Cool called Quicksilver: No Surrender #1 a "brilliant character-focused comic," saying, "Quicksilver: No Surrender #1 starts off on the right foot with a ponderous and self-reflective issue for Pietro Maximoff. Ahmed, Nguyen, and Renzi provide a compelling conflict for our hero with brilliant artwork and stunning color. This one gets a strong recommendation. Give it a read." Aaron Berkowitz of ComicsVerse gave Quicksilver: No Surrender #1 a score of 90%, writing, "has amazing characterization. Ahmed writes Pietro near-flawlessly. The plot is also incredibly intriguing. I want to know how Pietro gets out of this mess. However, I wasn’t a big fan of the art. Flip through the issue at your local comic shop and decide for yourself. For me, the writing was well worth the read, and may be well worth your $3.99."

Other versions

JLA/Avengers
In the DC/Marvel crossover JLA/Avengers, Pietro first appears being brainwashed by Starro when the Avengers battle him. Thanks to a combination of Wanda's magic and Ms. Marvel's powers, they manage to get Starro's probe off of him. When he and the other Avengers go to the DC Universe, he becomes fascinated with the Speed Force, seeking to empower by it and defeating The Flash (Wally West), but he fails twice. During the final battle in the Savage Land, he finally defeats the Flash, but only does so because there is no Speed Force in the Marvel Universe. He makes an appearance in the final battle with Krona, but it is very brief. He also appears at the end as one of the heroes that started out the entire event.

Marvel Zombies
In the limited series Marvel Zombies, Earth-2149 is contaminated with a virus that turns victims into flesh-eating zombies, with Quicksilver infected when bitten by a "zombified" Mystique (who at the time was impersonating his sister Wanda). This results in the rapid spread of the zombie virus, as Quicksilver is able to infect hundreds around the world in a short amount of time. The character reappears in the limited series Marvel Zombies 3, revealed to be working for a "zombified" Wilson Fisk. Quicksilver is eventually lured into a trap by the Earth-616 Machine Man and subsequently destroyed. The zombie virus spreads to a different Quicksilver in 'Earth Z', who is featured in the limited series Marvel Zombies Return. Here, his body is capable of operating independently of the head.

Marvel Zombies Return
When the zombies from Earth-2149 cross over into Earth-Z, Quicksilver is transformed into a zombie, and in Marvel Zombies Return #5 is one of the few remaining zombies left who fought against Spider-Man and his New Avengers, attempting to steal a canister containing the 'cure' that Spider-Man had developed, only for the wall-crawler to accidentally pull Quicksilver's head off when trying to catch him with his webbing. He was killed by a cyborg Iron Man.

Marvel 1602
Limited series Marvel 1602 depicts Quicksilver as Petros, the assistant (and secretly, son) of the High Inquisitor of the Spanish Catholic Church, Enrique.

Ultimate Marvel
Ultimate Marvel features a version of the character warped by constant abuse from Magneto. As a teenager, he was capable of reaching speeds of Mach 10.

After he and his sister, the Scarlet Witch, defected from their father's Brotherhood of Mutant Supremacy, they joined the Ultimates. The twin siblings also share an incestuous relationship. During the Ultimate X-Men's Magnetic North story arc, he watched over his father while he was imprisoned in the Triskelion, and threatened to kill him. In The Ultimates 3, he and his sister are apparently killed; however, Quicksilver later resurfaced at the end of the Absolute Power story arc, and killed Moira MacTaggert.

In Ultimatum #5, Quicksilver assassinated Cyclops as he is giving a speech at Washington, D.C., using the same bullet that was used to murder the Scarlet Witch.

Following the deaths of major characters of the X-Men and the Brotherhood, Pietro began to search for new Brotherhood team members. Mystique, Sabretooth and Teddy (the son of Blob) joined him in Wundagore, along with an apparently reborn Wanda.

Following his sister's orders, Quicksilver tried to help the White House, only resulting in the death of many mutants at the hands of Nimrod Model Sentinels, which were controlled by the Reverend Stryker before his death. When Pietro arrived in Egypt, he met his father, Erik, completely alive. However, this was revealed to be an illusion from Sinister. He attempts to manipulate his younger half-brother, Jimmy Hudson, but is defeated.

Later, he helps Reed Richards assemble some of the Infinity Gems and joins his team of Dark Ultimates. Quicksilver is fatally wounded after he turns against Richards and Kang, and chooses to die by Wanda's graveside.

Pietro later appeared to have been somehow brought back to life. He witnessed an instance of the cosmic phenomenon known as an incursion, the one which caused a collision between the planet Earth of his universe and that of an alternate reality, Earth-616, that resulted in the destruction of both universes.

When the Multiverse was eventually rebuilt, Quicksilver and the other foreign mutants, namely Jimmy, Nomi Blume aka Mach Two, Derek Morgan aka Guardian and Hisako Ichiki aka Armor, were abducted by super-villain geneticist Miss Sinister, who brainwashed and turned them into her personal enforcers, the New Marauders. When Jimmy's natural resistance to telepathy allowed him to break free from Miss Sinister's control and he went rogue, the New Marauders were deployed to retrieve him. In the process, they confronted the Time-Displaced Original X-Men, who had tracked down Jimmy after he was detected by Cerebro. Following a brief confrontation against the X-Men and Jimmy, during which Marvel Girl learned of Miss Sinister's involvement, the New Marauders were ordered by their superior to leave.

What If?
Quicksilver and Scarlet Witch appear in the What If? story "What If the X-Men Died on their First Mission?" as allies of Beast following the demise of the X-Men and upon the menace by Count Nefaria and his Ani-Men. Although invited to join the newly formed team upon the success of their mission, both decline in favor of their current commitments, although they promise their aid if they are needed.

X-Men Noir
In the one-shot X-Men Noir, Peter Magnus is a former college track star, and works in the Homicide Department of the NYPD with his father: Eric Magnus, Chief Detective and the leader of The Brotherhood.

In other media

Television
 Quicksilver appears in the "Captain America" segment of The Marvel Super Heroes, voiced by Len Carlson. This version is a member of the Avengers.
 Quicksilver appears in X-Men: The Animated Series, voiced by Adrian Egan and Paul Haddad. This version is a member of X-Factor.
 Quicksilver appears in X-Men: Evolution, voiced by Richard Ian Cox. This version is a teenager and member of the Brotherhood of Bayville. In a vision of the future depicted in the two-part series finale "Ascension", Quicksilver and the Brotherhood have reformed and joined S.H.I.E.L.D.
 Quicksilver appears in Wolverine and the X-Men, voiced by Mark Hildreth. This version is the leader of the Brotherhood of Mutants.
 Quicksilver appears in The Super Hero Squad Show episode "Hexed, Vexed, and Perplexed!", voiced by Scott Menville. Raised by Magneto to be villains, Quicksilver and his sister Scarlet Witch turn on their father after the Falcon offers them his friendship.

Film

Marvel licensed the filming rights of the X-Men and related concepts, such as mutants, to 20th Century Fox, who created a film series based on the franchise. Years later, Marvel started their own film franchise, the Marvel Cinematic Universe (MCU), which focused on characters that they had not licensed to other studios, such as the Avengers (see below). As a result, Quicksilver and Scarlet Witch became part of a claims dispute between the two studios, with Fox citing the pair being mutants and children of Magneto and Marvel citing the pair's editorial history making them more closely associated with the Avengers rather than the X-Men. In time, the two studios came to an agreement, allowing each other to use the characters so long as Fox did not reference them as members of the Avengers and Marvel did not mention them as mutants or children of Magneto. The arrangement became moot following the acquisition of 21st Century Fox by Disney - the parent company of Marvel Studios, and the confirmation that future X-Men films will take place within the Marvel Cinematic Universe.

A character based on Quicksilver named Peter Maximoff appears in the Fox films X-Men: Days of Future Past (2014), X-Men: Apocalypse (2016), Deadpool 2 (2018), and Dark Phoenix (2019) portrayed by Evan Peters. This version is an American teenager and an acquaintance of Logan's in the future. To demonstrate his super-speed, Days of Future Past director Bryan Singer shot all of Quicksilver's scenes in 3,600 frames per second. Over the course of his appearances, Peter helps the X-Men fight Apocalypse before joining them and learns Magneto is his father, but chooses not to tell him.

Marvel Cinematic Universe

Pietro Maximoff appears in media set in the Marvel Cinematic Universe (MCU). Primarily appearing in the film Avengers: Age of Ultron (portrayed by Aaron Taylor-Johnson), and first appeared in a mid-credits scene for Captain America: The Winter Soldier (2014). Pietro Maximoff and his sister Wanda Maximoff seek revenge on Tony Stark, whose weapons killed their parents, by joining Hydra, who use the Mind Stone to grant them superhuman powers after they volunteer to be experimented on. After Stark and the Avengers defeat the Hydra cell they were working with, the Maximoffs join forces with Ultron, only to learn he intends to kill all of humanity and defect to the Avengers to stop him. While thwarting his plot, Pietro dies while saving Hawkeye and a small child. Despite Taylor-Johnson signing a multi-picture deal, producer Kevin Feige has stated that there are no plans for Pietro to appear in future films. Following Disney's acquisition of Fox's film division, Taylor-Johnson was asked if he might return to the role, with the implication being that Evan Peters' competing version played a part in Feige's prior statement. While he expressed belief both parties were open to the possibility in the future, Taylor-Johnson reiterated that there were no immediate plans for him to reprise his role - specifically addressing speculation he would appear in the Disney+ series WandaVision. Although Taylor-Johnson did not reprise his role in the series, the character would be referenced, with Gabriel Gurevich portraying him as a child in flashbacks and Peters portraying Ralph Bohner, a resident of Westview, New Jersey who was brainwashed by Agatha Harkness and forced to impersonate Pietro to get close to Wanda until he is freed by Monica Rambeau.

Video games
 Quicksilver appears in Captain America and the Avengers.
 Quicksilver makes a cameo appearance in X-Men Legends II: Rise of Apocalypse. This version is a member of Magneto's Brotherhood of Mutants, having joined to keep him in check.
 Quicksilver appears as a boss in the PSP, PS2, and Wii versions of Marvel: Ultimate Alliance 2, voiced by Robert Tinkler.
 Quicksilver appears as a playable character in Marvel Super Hero Squad: The Infinity Gauntlet, voiced again by Scott Menville.
 Quicksilver appears in X-Men: Destiny, voiced by Sunil Malhotra.
 Quicksilver appears as a playable character in Marvel: Avengers Alliance.
 Quicksilver appears as a playable character in Marvel Super Hero Squad Online, voiced again by Scott Menville.
 Quicksilver appears as a playable character in Lego Marvel's Avengers, voiced by archival audio of Aaron Taylor-Johnson.
 Quicksilver appears as a playable character in Marvel: Future Fight.
 Quicksilver appears as a playable character in Marvel Puzzle Quest.

Collected editions

References

External links
 
 
 Quicksilver (1964) at Don Markstein's Toonopedia. Archived from the original on November 4, 2016

Avengers (comics) characters
Characters created by Jack Kirby
Characters created by Stan Lee
Comics characters introduced in 1964
Fictional characters who can duplicate themselves
Fictional characters who can manipulate sound
Fictional characters who can manipulate time
Fictional characters with air or wind abilities
Fictional characters with density control abilities
Fictional characters with eidetic memory
Fictional immigrants to the United States
Fictional Jews in comics
Fictional Serbian Jews
Fictional Serbian people
Jewish superheroes
Marvel Comics American superheroes
Marvel Comics characters who can move at superhuman speeds
Marvel Comics characters with accelerated healing
Marvel Comics male superheroes
Marvel Comics male supervillains
Marvel Comics mutants
Marvel Comics mutates
Marvel Comics superheroes
Marvel Comics supervillains
Romani comics characters
Superheroes who are adopted
Twin characters in comics
X-Factor (comics)
X-Men supporting characters